AQtime is a performance profiler and memory/resource debugging toolset developed by SmartBear Software. It is integrated into Microsoft Visual Studio, Visual Studio Test Projects and Embarcadero RAD Studio that allows analyzing the application without leaving the development environment.

Overview 
AQtime is used for multiple optimization tasks to improve application performance and memory usage. It includes a set of profilers for analysis of different application aspects. It does sophisticated application performance analysis of function execution time down to the individual source code lines. It tracks performance issues and memory leaks. It analyzes resource usage and function call order. It monitors code coverage, Windows API compliance and includes other profilers for analyzing more application properties.

Features
 Support for Windows and .NET compilers.
 Support for profiling 32- and 64-bit applications.
 Profiling Java and Silverlight Applications.
 Profiling scripts.
 Integration into Microsoft Visual Studio and Embarcadero RAD Studio IDEs.

Awards
 Software Development Jolt Awards presented by Software Development magazine: 2006
 Delphi Informant Readers Choice Awards as the Best in the Debugging Tool category: 2004, 2003
 asp.netPRO Readers' Choice Awards: 2005
 The Best in the .NET Profiler category .NET Developer's Journal's Readers' Choice Awards: 2004

See also

Software optimization
Performance analysis
List of performance analysis tools
Debugger
Memory debugger

References

External links
AQtime page
AQtime forum
AQtime on Softpedia

Profilers
Debuggers